Timiryakovo (Timeräk) is a rural locality (a village) in Yunusovsky Selsoviet, Mechetlinsky District, Bashkortostan, Russia. The population was 118 as of 2010. There are 2 streets.

Geography 
Timiryakovo is located 24 km southeast of Bolsheustyikinskoye (the district's administrative centre) by road. Yunusovo is the nearest rural locality.

References 

Rural localities in Mechetlinsky District